Titos Vandis (7 November 1917 – 23 February 2003) was a Greek actor.

Biography
Vandis began his career on the Greek stage in the late 1930s.  In 1962, he won the Best Actor award for the film Poliorkia at the Thessaloniki International Film Festival.  Vandis left Greece when a dictatorship took power and lived in the United States for 24 years.

Vandis appeared in over 250 plays before making his Broadway debut in the Tony-nominated musical On A Clear Day You Can See Forever (1965). He originated the role of Themistocles Kriakos, a Greek shipping magnate who believed in reincarnation and planned to leave his fortune to his future self. Boston Globe critic Kevin Kelly wrote that Vandis played the role with "marvellous finesse" and that the character was "rather like Zorba as a businessman with $4 million."  

Vandis was in the original Broadway cast and led the title song in Illya Darling (1967), a musical based on his film Never on Sunday (1960).  The title character Illya was a carefree Greek prostitute. Newsday critic George Oppenheimer wrote, “Major credit goes to Titos Vandis for his playing of Illya's oldest client, who sings and dances as rousingly as the youngsters...”  Vandis reprised his role in a Westbury Music Fair production in 1968.  Newsday critic Murry Frymer wrote that Vandis “... is delightfully authentic.  In fact, he's better than that.  Vandis has been in both the film Never on Sunday and the Broadway production of Illya Darling and he's not tired of it at all.  His portrayal was fresh and kept bringing the affair back to the colorful gayety that bubbled through the motion picture.”

In 1970 Vandis joined the cast of Man of La Mancha as Sancho Panza at the Martin Beck Theater.  He also played the title role in the musical Zorba at the Paper Mill Playhouse in Millburn, NJ.  Critic W. C. Flahault wrote, "His portrayal of the Greek vagabond with an eye for the girls has an earthiness which brings reality to the role."  

In 1972 Vandis played an uneducated coal miner on  Ironside who sought Ironside's help in discovering the murderer of his daughter.  He admitted "that drama was easier for him than the musical stage."  Vandis said, "I suppose this part can be considered a change of pace for me, but as an actor, I find myself considering each role I play as a separate entity...During the days of my early training, I often played old men; in fact, I relished the opportunities.  Today, of course, as I grow older, I wish the positions were reversed!"  

That same year, he appeared in the Woody Allen film Everything You Always Wanted to Know About Sex* (*But Were Afraid to Ask) as Milos Stavros, an Armenian shepherd who was in love with a sheep.  In The Exorcist (1973), he played the uncle of protagonist Father Damien Karras. Vandis wore a hat in one shot that obscured his face, as producer William Friedkin felt that Vandis's face would be connected with his previous role as Milos.

Vandis had a recurring role in the detective series Baretta (1975-1978), having appeared in four episodes, and guest-starred alongside Hulk Hogan in The A-Team episode "Body Slam" (1985-1986 season). His other TV appearances have included Trapper John, MD, M*A*S*H, The Odd Couple, Kojak, Barney Miller, Wonder Woman, Newhart, and The Mary Tyler Moore Show.

Selected filmography

 To kleidi tis eftyhias (1953) - Nikolas
 Gynaikes dihos antres (1954) - Loukas
 To paidi tou dromou (1957) - Giorgis
 Oi paranomoi (1958) - Kosmas
 Miden pente (1958)
 Agnes psyhes (1959)
 Astero (1959) - Mitros Pithokoukouras
 Never on Sunday (1960) - Jorgo
 To potami (1960)
 Egklima sta paraskinia (1960) - Inspector Bekas
 Pothoi sta stahya (1960) - Giannis Tsakas
 To rantevou tis Kyriakis (1960)
 Poliorkia (1962) - Stelios
 I katara tis mannas (1962) - Vagias
 It Happened in Athens (1962) - Father Loues
 Island of Love (1963) - Father Anaxagoras
 Topkapi (1964) - Harback
 O teleftaios peirasmos (1964) - Dr. Kalomoiris
 I Kypros stis floges (1964)
 Apagogi (1964) - Lieutenant Stergiou
 Ohi, ...kyrie Johnson (1965)
 What's So Bad About Feeling Good? (1968) - Captain Narcopolis (uncredited)
 Stiletto (1969) - Tonio
 Everything You Always Wanted to Know About Sex* (*But Were Afraid to Ask) (1972) - Milos
 Genesis II (1973) - Yuloff
 The Exorcist (1973) - John, Karras's uncle
 Zandy's Bride (1974) - Demas (uncredited)
 Newman's Law (1974) - Grainie
 Harrad Summer (1974) - Mr. Kolasukas
 Black Samson (1974) - Giuseppe "Joe" Nappa
 Once Upon a Scoundrel (1974) - Dr. Fernandez
 Smile (1975) - Emile
 Satan's Triangle (1975) - Salao
 Gus (1976) - Papa Petrovic
 Alex & the Gypsy (1976) - Treska
 The Other Side of Midnight (1977) - President of the Council
 A Piece of the Action (1977) - Bruno
 Oh, God! (1977) - Greek Bishop Markos
 The Betsy (1978) - Angelo Luigi Perino
 The President's Mistress (1978) - Anatoly
 A Perfect Couple (1979) - Panos Theodopoulos
 The Miracle Worker (1979) - Anagnos
 O falakros mathitis (1979) - Vesuvius Karatampanos
 Hart to Hart (1981) - Xenophon Papadopoulos
 National Lampoon's Movie Madness (1982) -Nixos Naxos ("Success Wanters")
 Young Doctors in Love (1982) - Sal Bonafetti 
 Prosohi, kindynos! (1983) - Sideris
 Ta hronia tis thyellas (1984) - Priest
 Fletch Lives (1989) - Uncle Kakakis
 To athoo soma (1997)

References

External links

1917 births
2003 deaths
Greek male film actors
Actors from Thessaloniki
Greek expatriates in the United States
Greek male stage actors
Greek male television actors
20th-century Greek male actors